Sardar Bhuma Singh Dhillon (died 1746) was a royal Jat Sikh warrior of the 18th century in Punjab and the second leader of the Bhangi Misl succeeding Sardar Chhajja Singh.

Sardar Bhuma Singh was a Dhillon Jat of the village of Hung, near Badhni in present-day Moga district, who won a name for himself in skirmishes with Nadir Shah's troops in 1739. Bhuma Singh's latent genius as an organiser and commander gave stimulus and growth to the Bhangi misl. Historical records indicate he died in the Chhota ghallughara (holocaust) in 1746, while defending the Sikh community, from Afghan attacks. Bhuma Singh was childless so he adopted his nephew as his son, Hari Singh Dhillon. On Bhuma Singh's death in 1746, his nephew and adopted son, Hari Singh Dhillon, assumed the leadership of the Bhangi Misl. The Bhangi Misl got its name from the addiction of Hashish(Bhang) of Bhuma Singh Dhillon.

See also 

 Sikh Confederacy
 Misl
 Bhangi Misl

References 

Indian Sikhs
Jat rulers
Sikh warriors
 
1746 deaths
Year of birth unknown